Steven Anthony Ballmer (March 24, 1956) is an American businessman and investor who served as the chief executive officer of Microsoft from 2000 to 2014. He is the owner of the Los Angeles Clippers of the National Basketball Association (NBA). As of February 2023, Bloomberg Billionaires Index estimates his personal wealth at around $90 billion, making him the eighth-richest person on Earth.

Ballmer was hired by Bill Gates at Microsoft in 1980, and subsequently left the MBA program at Stanford University. He eventually became president in 1998, and replaced Gates as CEO on January 13, 2000. On February 4, 2014, Ballmer retired as CEO and was replaced by Satya Nadella; Ballmer remained on Microsoft's Board of Directors until August 19, 2014, when he left to prepare for teaching a new class.

His tenure and legacy as Microsoft CEO has received mixed reception, with the company tripling sales and doubling profits, but losing its market dominance and missing out on 21st-century technology trends such as the ascendance of smartphones in the form of iPhone and Android.

Early life and education
Ballmer was born in Detroit, Michigan; he is the son of Beatrice Dvorkin and Frederic Henry (Fritz Hans) Ballmer, a manager at the Ford Motor Company. Frederic was from Zuchwil, Switzerland and arrived in the United States in 1948. Steve's mother was the daughter of Shmuel Dvorkin, a Russian Jew who fled to the United States in 1914 and became a merchant for a glass store. Through his mother, Ballmer is a second cousin of actress and comedian Gilda Radner. Ballmer grew up in the affluent community of Farmington Hills, Michigan. Ballmer also lived in Brussels from 1964 to 1967, where he attended the International School of Brussels.

In 1973, he attended college prep and engineering classes at Lawrence Technological University. He graduated as valedictorian from Detroit Country Day School, a private college preparatory school in Beverly Hills, Michigan, with a score of 800 on the mathematical section of the SAT and was a National Merit Scholar. (He eventually became a member of the school's board of directors.)

Ballmer attended Harvard University, where he was a manager for the Harvard Crimson football team and a member of the Fox Club, worked on The Harvard Crimson newspaper as well as the Harvard Advocate, and lived down the hall from fellow sophomore Bill Gates. He scored highly in the William Lowell Putnam Mathematical Competition, an exam sponsored by the Mathematical Association of America, scoring higher than Bill Gates. He graduated magna cum laude with a Bachelor of Arts in applied mathematics and economics in 1977.

Ballmer worked as an assistant product manager at Procter & Gamble for two years, where he shared an office with Jeff Immelt, who later became CEO of General Electric. After briefly trying to write screenplays in Hollywood, he started attending the Stanford Graduate School of Business for his MBA, but dropped out in 1980 to join Microsoft.

History with Microsoft
Ballmer joined Microsoft on June 11, 1980, and became Microsoft's 30th employee and the first business manager hired by Gates.

Ballmer was offered a salary of $50,000 as well as 5-10% of the company. When Microsoft was incorporated in 1981, Ballmer owned 8% of the company. In 2003, Ballmer sold 39.3 million Microsoft shares equating to approximately $955 million, thereby reducing his ownership to 4%. The same year, he replaced Microsoft's employee stock options program.

In the 20 years following his hire, Ballmer headed several Microsoft divisions, including operations, operating systems development, and sales and support. From February 1992 onwards, he was Executive Vice President, Sales, and Support. Ballmer led Microsoft's development of the .NET Framework. Ballmer was then promoted to President of Microsoft, a title that he held from July 1998 to February 2001, making him the de facto number two in the company to the chairman and CEO, Bill Gates.

Chief Executive Officer (2000–2014)

On January 13, 2000, Ballmer was officially named the chief executive officer. As CEO, Ballmer handled company finances and daily operations, but Gates remained chairman of the board and still retained control of the "technological vision" as chief software architect. Gates relinquished day-to-day activities when he stepped down as chief software architect in 2006, while staying on as chairman, and that gave Ballmer the autonomy needed to make major management changes at Microsoft.

When Ballmer took over as CEO, the company was fighting an antitrust lawsuit brought on by the U.S. government and 20 states, plus class-action lawsuits and complaints from rival companies. While it was said that Gates would have continued fighting the suit, Ballmer made it his priority to settle these saying: "Being the object of a lawsuit, effectively, or a complaint from your government is a very awkward, uncomfortable position to be in. It just has all downside. People assume if the government brought a complaint that there's really a problem, and your ability to say we're a good, proper, moral place is tough. It's actually tough, even though you feel that way about yourselves."

Upon becoming CEO, Ballmer required detailed business justification in order to approve of new products, rather than allowing hundreds of products that sounded potentially interesting or trendy. In 2005, he recruited B. Kevin Turner from Walmart, who was the President and CEO of Sam's Club, to become Microsoft's Chief Operating Officer. Turner was hired at Microsoft to lead the company's sales, marketing and services group and to instill more process and discipline in the company's operations and salesforce.

Since Bill Gates' retirement, Ballmer oversaw a "dramatic shift away from the company's PC-first heritage", replacing most major division heads in order to break down the "talent-hoarding fiefdoms", prompting Businessweek to say that the company "arguably [had] the best product lineup in its history" in 2012 as a result. Ballmer was instrumental in driving Microsoft's connected computing strategy, with acquisitions such as Skype.

Under Ballmer's tenure as CEO, Microsoft's share price stagnated. The lackluster stock performance occurred despite Microsoft's financial success at that time. The company's annual revenue surged from $25 billion to $70 billion, while its net income increased 215% to $23 billion, and its gross profit of 75 cents on every dollar in sales is double that of Google or IBM. In terms of leading the company's total annual profit growth of 16.4%, Ballmer's tenure at Microsoft surpassed the performances of other well-known CEOs such as General Electric's Jack Welch (11.2%) and IBM's Louis V. Gerstner Jr. (2%). These gains came from the existing Windows and Office franchises, with Ballmer maintaining their profitability, fending off threats from competitors such as Linux and other open-source operating systems and Google Docs. Ballmer also built half a dozen new businesses, such as the data centers division and the Xbox entertainment and devices division ($8.9 billion), (which prevented the Sony PlayStation and other gaming consoles from undermining Windows), and oversaw the acquisition of Skype. Ballmer also constructed the company's $20 billion Enterprise Business, consisting of new products and services such as Exchange, Windows Server, SQL Server, SharePoint, System Center, and Dynamics CRM, each of which initially faced an uphill battle for acceptance but have emerged as leading or dominant in each category. This diversified product mix helped to offset the company's reliance on PCs and mobile computing devices as the company entered the Post-PC era; in reporting quarterly results during April 2013, while Windows Phone 8 and Windows 8 had not managed to increase their market share above single digits, the company increased its profit 19% over the previous quarter in 2012, as the Microsoft Business Division (including Office 365) and Server and Tools division (cloud services) are each larger than the Windows division.

Ballmer attracted criticism for failing to capitalize on several new consumer technologies, forcing Microsoft to play catch-up in the areas of tablet computing, smartphones and music players with mixed results. According to the Wall Street Journal, under Ballmer's watch, "In many cases, Microsoft latched onto technologies like smartphones, touchscreens, 'smart' cars and wristwatches that read sports scores aloud long before Apple or Google did. But it repeatedly killed promising projects if they threatened its cash cows [Windows and Office]." Ballmer was even named one of the worst CEOs of 2013 by the BBC. As a result of these many criticisms, in May 2012, hedge fund manager David Einhorn called on Ballmer to step down as CEO of Microsoft. "His continued presence is the biggest overhang on Microsoft's stock," Einhorn said in reference to Ballmer. In a May 2012 column in Forbes magazine, Adam Hartung described Ballmer as "the worst CEO of a large publicly traded American company", saying he had "steered Microsoft out of some of the fastest growing and most lucrative tech markets (mobile music, headsets and tablets)".

In 2009, and for the first time since Bill Gates resigned from day-to-day management at Microsoft, Ballmer delivered the opening keynote at CES.

As part of his plans to expand on hardware, on June 19, 2012, Ballmer revealed Microsoft's first ever computer device, a tablet called Microsoft Surface at an event held in Hollywood, Los Angeles. He followed this by announcing the company's purchase of Nokia's mobile phone division in September 2013, his last major acquisition for Microsoft as CEO.

On August 23, 2013, Microsoft announced that Ballmer would retire within the next 12 months. A special committee that included Bill Gates would decide on the next CEO.

There was a list of potential successors to Ballmer as Microsoft CEO, but all had departed the company: Jim Allchin, Brad Silverberg, Paul Maritz, Nathan Myhrvold, Greg Maffei, Pete Higgins, Jeff Raikes, J. Allard, Robbie Bach, Bill Veghte, Ray Ozzie, Bob Muglia and Steven Sinofsky. B. Kevin Turner, Microsoft's Chief Operating Officer (COO), was considered by some to be a de facto number two to Ballmer, with Turner having a strong grasp of business and operations but lacking technological vision. On February 4, 2014, Satya Nadella succeeded Ballmer as CEO.

Public image
Although as a child he was so shy that he would hyperventilate before Hebrew school, Ballmer is known for his energetic and exuberant personality, which is meant to motivate employees and partners, shouting so much that he needed surgery on his vocal cords.

Ballmer's excited stage appearances at Microsoft events are widely circulated on the Internet as viral videos. One of his earliest known viral videos was a parody video, produced for Microsoft employees in 1986, promoting Windows 1.0 in the style of a Crazy Eddie commercial. Ballmer and Brian Valentine repeated this in a spoof promotion of Windows XP later on.

A widely circulated video was his entrance on stage at Microsoft's 25th anniversary event in September 2000, where Ballmer jumped across the stage and shouted "I love this company!" Another well-known viral video was one captured at a Windows 2000 developers' conference, featuring a perspiring Ballmer chanting the word "developers".

Relationship with Bill Gates
Ballmer was Gates' best man at his wedding to Melinda French, and the two men described their relationship as a marriage. They were so close for years that another Microsoft executive described it as a mind meld. Combative debates—a part of Microsoft's corporate culture—that many observers believed were personal arguments occurred within the relationship; while Gates was glad in 2000 that Ballmer was willing to become CEO so he could focus on technology, the Wall Street Journal reported that there was tension surrounding the transition of authority. Things became so bitter that, on one occasion, Gates stormed out of a meeting after a shouting match in which Ballmer jumped to the defense of several colleagues, according to an individual present at the time. After the exchange, Ballmer seemed "remorseful", the person said. Once Gates leaves, "I'm not going to need him for anything. That's the principle", Ballmer said. "Use him, yes, need him, no".

In October 2014, a few months after Ballmer left his post at Microsoft, a Vanity Fair profile stated that Ballmer and Gates no longer talk to each other due to animosity over Ballmer's resignation. In a November 2016 interview, Ballmer said he and Gates have "drifted apart" ever since, saying that they always had a "brotherly relationship" beforehand. He said that his push into the hardware business, specifically smartphones, which Gates did not support, contributed to their relationship breakdown.

Retirement
After saying in 2008 that he intended to remain CEO for another decade, Ballmer announced his retirement in 2013, after losing billions of dollars in acquisitions and on the Surface tablet. Microsoft's stock price rebounded on the news.

Ballmer says that he regretted the lack of focus on Windows Mobile in the early 2000s, leaving Microsoft a distant third in the (then current) 2013 smartphone market. Moreover, he attributed the success of the expensively-priced iPhones to carrier subsidies. He went on to say, He called the acquisition of the mobile phone division of Nokia his "toughest decision" during his tenure, as it was overseeing the changing profile of Microsoft as it was expanding on hardware.

Ballmer hosted his last company meeting in September 2013, and stepped down from the company's board of directors, in August 2014.

On December 24, 2014, the Seattle Times reported that the IRS sued Ballmer, Craig Mundie, Jeff Raikes, Jim Allchin, Orlando Ayala and David Guenther in an effort to compel them to testify in Microsoft's corporate tax audit. The IRS has been looking into how Microsoft and other companies deal with transfer pricing.

Other positions
Ballmer served as director of Accenture Ltd. and a general partner of Accenture SCA from 2001 to 2006.

On competing companies and software

Apple
In 2007, Ballmer said "There's no chance that the [Apple] iPhone is going to get any significant market share. No chance."

Speaking at a conference in NYC in 2009, Ballmer criticized Apple's pricing, saying, "Now I think the tide has turned back the other direction (against Apple). The economy is helpful. Paying an extra $500 for a computer in this environment—same piece of hardware—paying $500 more to get a logo on it? I think that's a more challenging proposition for the average person than it used to be."

In 2015, Ballmer called Microsoft's decision to invest in Apple to save it from bankruptcy in 1997 as the "craziest thing we ever did." By 2015, Apple was the world's most valuable company.

In 2016, Ballmer did an interview with Bloomberg where Ballmer added context to his iPhone statement, saying "People like to point to this quote...but the reason I said that was the price of $600-$700 was too high," he says he did not realize the business model innovation that Apple was going to deploy, using the carriers to subsidize the phones by building the cost into the customer's monthly bill.

Free and open source software

In July 2000, Ballmer called the free software Linux kernel "communism" and further claimed that it infringed with Microsoft's intellectual property. In June 2001 he called Linux a "cancer that attaches itself in an intellectual property sense to everything it touches". Ballmer used the notion of "viral" licensing terms to express his concern over the fact that the GNU General Public License (GPL) employed by such software requires that all derivative software be under the GPL or a compatible license. In April 2003 he even interrupted his skiing holiday in Switzerland to personally plead with the mayor of Munich not to switch to Linux. But he did not succeed with this and Munich switched to LiMux, despite his offering a 35% discount at his lobbying visit.

In March 2016, Ballmer changed his stance on Linux, saying that he supports his successor Satya Nadella's open source commitments. He maintained that his comments in 2001 were right at the time but that times have changed.

Google
In 2005, Microsoft sued Google for hiring one of its previous vice presidents, Kai-Fu Lee, claiming it was in violation of his one-year non-compete clause in his contract. Mark Lucovsky, who left for Google in 2004, alleged in a sworn statement to a Washington state court that Ballmer became enraged upon hearing that Lucovsky was about to leave Microsoft for Google, picked up his chair, and threw it across his office, and that, referring to then Google Executive Chairman Eric Schmidt (who had previously worked for competitors Sun and Novell), Ballmer vowed to "kill Google." Lucovsky reports:

Ballmer then resumed attempting to persuade Lucovsky to stay at Microsoft. Ballmer has described Lucovsky's account of the incident as a "gross exaggeration of what actually took place".

During the 2011 Web 2.0 Summit in San Francisco, he said: "You don't need to be a computer scientist to use a Windows Phone and you do to use an Android phone ... It is hard for me to be excited about the Android phones."

In 2013, Ballmer said that Google was a "monopoly" that should be pressured from market competition authorities.

Sports
On March 6, 2008, Seattle mayor Greg Nickels announced that a local ownership group involving Ballmer made a "game-changing" commitment to invest $150 million in cash toward a proposed $300 million renovation of KeyArena and were ready to purchase the Seattle SuperSonics from the Professional Basketball Club LLC in order to keep the team in Seattle. However, this initiative failed, and the SuperSonics relocated to Oklahoma City, Oklahoma, where they now play as the Oklahoma City Thunder.

In June 2012, Ballmer was an investor in Chris R. Hansen's proposal to build a new arena in the SoDo neighborhood of Seattle and bring the SuperSonics back to Seattle. On January 9, 2013, Ballmer and Hansen led a group of investors in an attempt to purchase the Sacramento Kings from the Maloof family and relocate them to Seattle for an estimated $650 million. However, this attempt also fell through.

Following the Donald Sterling scandal in May 2014, Ballmer was the highest bidder in an attempt to purchase the Los Angeles Clippers for a reported price of $2 billion, which was then the second highest bid for a sports franchise in North American sports history (after the $2.15 billion sale of the Los Angeles Dodgers in 2012). After a California court confirmed the authority of Shelly Sterling to sell the team, it was officially announced on August 12, 2014, that Ballmer would become the Los Angeles Clippers owner.

On September 25, 2014, Ballmer said he would bar the team from using Apple products such as iPads, and replace them with Microsoft products. It has been reported that he had previously also barred his family from using iPhones.

In March 2020, Ballmer agreed to buy The Forum in Inglewood, California. The purchase would allow him to build the Intuit Dome in the nearby area since plans for a new Clippers' arena were opposed by the former owners of The Forum.

In a survey conducted by The Athletic in December 2020, Ballmer was voted the best owner in basketball.

Wealth
Ballmer was the second person after Roberto Goizueta to become a billionaire in U.S. dollars based on stock options received as an employee of a corporation in which he was neither a founder nor a relative of a founder. As of November 2021, Bloomberg Billionaires Index estimates his personal wealth at $117 billion, ranking him as the 8th richest person in the world.

Philanthropy
On November 12, 2014, it was announced that Ballmer and his wife Connie donated $50 million to the University of Oregon. Connie Ballmer is a University of Oregon alumnus and previously served on the institution's board of trustees. The funds will go toward the university's $2 billion fundraising effort, and will focus on scholarships, public health research and advocacy, and external branding/communications. On November 13, 2014, it was announced that Ballmer would provide a gift, estimated at $60 million, to Harvard University's computer science department. The gift would allow the department to hire new faculty, and hopefully increase the national stature of the program. Ballmer previously donated $10 million to the same department in 1994, in a joint-gift with Bill Gates.

In 2022, Ballmer made a large gift of $425 million to University of Oregon to fund a new institute for children's behavioral health.

Ballmer serves on the World Chairman's Council of the Jewish National Fund, which means he has donated US$1 million or more to the JNF.

USAFacts
Ballmer launched USAFacts.org in 2017, a non-profit organization whose goal is to allow people to understand US government revenue, spending and societal impact. He is reported to have contributed $10 million to fund teams of researchers who populated the website's database with official data.

Personal life
In 1990, Ballmer married Connie Snyder; they have three sons.

The Ballmers live in Hunts Point, Washington.

References

External links

 Corporate biography
 CS50 Lecture by Steve Ballmer at Harvard University, November 2014
 South China Morning Post audio interview
 Steve Ballmer Playlist  Appearance on WMBR's Dinnertime Sampler  radio show February 23, 2005
 Forbes Profile

1956 births
20th-century American businesspeople
21st-century American businesspeople
American billionaires
American chief operating officers
American computer businesspeople
American Internet celebrities
American people of Belarusian-Jewish descent
American people of Swiss descent
American technology chief executives
Businesspeople from Detroit
Businesspeople from Seattle
Businesspeople in software
Chevaliers of the Légion d'honneur
Detroit Country Day School alumni
Directors of Microsoft
The Harvard Crimson people
Harvard Advocate alumni
Jewish American sportspeople
Living people
Los Angeles Clippers owners
Microsoft employees
People from Farmington Hills, Michigan
People from Hunts Point, Washington
Stanford University students
21st-century American Jews